Henderson Bridge may refer to:
 Henderson Bridge (Ohio River), rail bridge in Henderson, Kentucky
 Henderson Bridge (Rhode Island), connecting the cities of Providence and East Providence
 A nickname for the Bi-State Vietnam Gold Star Bridges that cross the Ohio River between Henderson, Kentucky and Evansville, Indiana
 The Henderson Street Bridge in Fort Worth, Texas, listed on the NRHP in Texas